Lloyd Glasspool and Harri Heliövaara defeated Jamie Murray and Michael Venus in the final, 6–3, 7–6(7–3) to win the men's doubles tennis title at the 2023 Adelaide International 1.

Rohan Bopanna and Ramkumar Ramanathan were the reigning champions, but chose to compete in Pune instead.

Seeds
All seeds received a bye into the second round.

Draw

Finals

Top half

Bottom half

References

External links 
Draw

2023 Adelaide International
2023 ATP Tour
Adelaide